Catonephele numilia, the blue-frosted banner, blue-frosted Catone, Grecian shoemaker or stoplight Catone, is a butterfly of the family Nymphalidae found in Central and South America.

Description

There is sexual dimorphism in the adults, with the males being black with six orange dots on the dorsal surface of the wings, whereas females are black with a light yellow band across the centre of the forewings. This butterfly usually flies along the ground and close to the ripe fruits and flowers. It can live a month. Adults feed on rotten fruits, while caterpillars feed on Alchornea species (family Euphorbiaceae).

Distribution
Catonephele numilia can be found in most of Central and South America.

Subspecies
 Catonephele numilia numilia (Suriname)
 Catonephele numilia penthia (Hewitson, 1852) (Brazil)
 Catonephele numilia esite (R. Felder, 1869) (Mexico to Colombia, Ecuador, Venezuela, Trinidad) – synonym of Catonephele numilia penthiana Staudinger, 1886
 Catonephele numilia neogermanica Stichel, 1899 (Paraguay, Brazil)
 Catonephele numilia immaculata Jenkins, 1985 (Mexico)

Gallery

References

 Tree of Life
 DeVries, P.J. (1987) The Butterflies of Costa Rica and their Natural History, Princeton University Press, Princeton
 Lamas, G., Ed. (2004) Atlas of Neotropical Lepidoptera. Gainesville, Scientific Publishers/Association of Tropical Lepidoptera.

External links

 Butterflies of America
 Nymphalidae.utu.fi

Biblidinae
Butterflies described in 1775
Fauna of Brazil
Nymphalidae of South America
Taxa named by Pieter Cramer